Bill Gates (born 1955) is an American business magnate and co-founder of Microsoft Corporation.

Bill or William Gates or similar, may also refer to:

People
 Bill Gates Sr. (1925–2020), American attorney and philanthropist, father of Microsoft co-founder Bill Gates
 Bill Gates (frontiersman) (1860–1935), American frontiersman
 Bill Gates, a Brisbane DJ and early promoter, and co-namesake, of the Bee Gees
 Willie Gates (born 1987), U.S. mixed martial artist
 William "Pop" Gates (1917–1999), American basketball player
 William Gates (basketball) (born 1971), American basketball player, subject of 1994 movie Hoop Dreams
 William Thomas George Gates (1905–1990), British banker
 William E. Gates (1863–1940), linguist and archaeologist
 William Gates (soldier) (1788–1868), U.S. Army officer
 William E. Gates, publisher of Midnight Engineering computer magazine,
 Bill Gates, chairman of the Maricopa County Board of Supervisors in Arizona.

Other
 "Bill Gates", a song by American rapper Lil Wayne from the 2010 album I Am Not a Human Being

See also